Vadim Borisov (born 30 April 1955) is a former Russian tennis player who competed for the Soviet Union.

Career
At the 1973 French Open, Borisov competed in both the men's doubles (with Viorel Marcu) and mixed doubles (with Natasha Chmyreva), but was unable to progress past the opening round in either. His only other Grand Slam appearance came in the 1976 Wimbledon Championships, where he lost in the first round of the singles draw, to Kenichi Hirai. He also played in the mixed doubles, again partnering Natasha Chmyreva and once more lost in the opening round.

Borisov won five medals in the Summer Universiade during his career, including two gold medals at Mexico City in 1979.

In 1980, Borisov was runner-up in both the singles and doubles at the Sofia Open, which was part of the Grand Prix tennis circuit. His singles wins were over Leo Palin, Ismail El Shafei, Andrei Dîrzu and Louk Sanders.

Borisov appeared in 11 ties Davis Cup ties for the Soviet Union team, from 1976 to 1984. He won 11 of his 23 Davis Cup rubbers, finishing with an 8/6 record in singles and 3/6 record in doubles. His best win was over Yannick Noah, at Montpellier in 1980. He was captain of the Russian Davis Cup team which was a finalist in the 1994 Davis Cup.

Grand Prix career finals

Singles: 1 (0–1)

Doubles: 1 (0–1)

Challenger titles

Singles: (1)

References

1955 births
Living people
Soviet male tennis players
Russian tennis coaches
Universiade medalists in tennis
Universiade gold medalists for the Soviet Union
Universiade silver medalists for the Soviet Union
Universiade bronze medalists for the Soviet Union
Medalists at the 1977 Summer Universiade
Medalists at the 1979 Summer Universiade
Medalists at the 1981 Summer Universiade
Friendship Games medalists in tennis